Arroyo de La Ventana is a village and municipality in Río Negro Province in Argentina.

References

External links
 Coord.geográficas e imágenes NASA, Google

Populated places in Río Negro Province